Hubert Lockwood (26 January 1909 – 25 May 2005) was an English rugby union and professional rugby league footballer who played in the 1930s and 1940s, and cricketer. He played club level rugby union (RU) for Huddersfield R.U.F.C., and representative rugby league (RL) for Yorkshire, and at club level for Huddersfield and  Halifax, as a goal-kicking .

Background
Hubert Lockwood was born in Huddersfield, West Riding of Yorkshire, England, he founded a laundry and dry cleaning business with a shop in Elland in 1953, and he died aged 96 at Kirkwood Hospice, Dalton, Huddersfield, West Yorkshire, England.

Playing career

County Honours
Hubert Lockwood won caps for Yorkshire (RL) while at Halifax.

Challenge Cup Final appearances
Hubert Lockwood played , and scored 4-goals, in Halifax's 20–3 victory over Salford in the 1938–39 Challenge Cup Final during the 1938–39 season at Wembley Stadium, London on Saturday 6 May 1939, in front of a crowd of 55,453, and played  in the 10-15 defeat by Leeds in the 1941–42 Challenge Cup Final during the 1941–42 season on Saturday 6 June 1942.

Club career
Hubert Lockwood changed rugby football codes from rugby union to rugby league when he transferred from Huddersfield (RU) to Huddersfield (RL), he transferred from Huddersfield to Halifax on 27 January 1934, he made his dêbut for Halifax on Saturday 27 January 1934, and he played his last match for Halifax on Monday 22 April 1946.

Honoured at Halifax
Hubert Lockwood is a Halifax Hall Of Fame Inductee.

References

External links
Obituary - Hubert Lockwood
Challenge Cup winner and RL stalwart
Glory day for the Fax
Rugby League: Thrum Hall tradition ends after 112 years
Dave Fleming's Blast from the Past
Hall of Fame
John Lockwood
Fifties Glamour Marks Half Century

1909 births
2005 deaths
English rugby league players
English rugby union players
Halifax R.L.F.C. players
Huddersfield Giants players
Huddersfield R.U.F.C. players
Rugby league players from Huddersfield
Rugby league fullbacks
Rugby union players from Huddersfield
Yorkshire rugby league team players